Jacek Nawrocki (born 20 August 1965) is a Polish professional volleyball coach and former player.

Personal life
Nawrocki was born in Tomaszów Mazowiecki. His brother Stanisław Nawrocki is a physicist. He has wife Agnieszka and two children – son Bartłomiej and daughter Aleksandra.

Career as coach
From 2009 to 2013, he was the head coach of PGE Skra Bełchatów. He led the team to two titles of the Polish Champions, two Polish Cups, one Polish SuperCup, medals of CEV Champions League (bronze in 2010, silver in 2012), medals of Club World Championship (silver in 2009 and 2010, bronze in 2012). In 2013, he was replaced by Miguel Ángel Falasca.

From 2013 to 2015, he was an assistant coach of the Polish national U19 team. On 12 April 2015, Poland won a title of the U19 European Champion.

In April 2015, he was announced as the new head coach of the Poland women's national volleyball team.

Honours

Clubs
 CEV Champions League
  2011/2012 – with PGE Skra Bełchatów

 FIVB Club World Championship
  Doha 2009 – with PGE Skra Bełchatów
  Doha 2010 – with PGE Skra Bełchatów

 National championships
 2009/2010  Polish Championship, with PGE Skra Bełchatów
 2010/2011  Polish Cup, with PGE Skra Bełchatów
 2010/2011  Polish Championship, with PGE Skra Bełchatów
 2011/2012  Polish Cup, with PGE Skra Bełchatów
 2012/2013  Polish SuperCup, with PGE Skra Bełchatów

References

External links

 
 Coach profile at Volleybox.net

1965 births
Living people
People from Tomaszów Mazowiecki
Polish men's volleyball players
Polish volleyball coaches
Volleyball coaches of international teams
Skra Bełchatów coaches
Czarni Radom coaches